The Raptor was a four to five-seat single-engined canard-wing homebuilt light aircraft, whose prototype was under development by Raptor Aircraft of Ball Ground, Georgia, United States. The Raptor's tricycle landing gear was fully retractable, and the  streamlined pressurized airframe was to be optimized for a fast cruising speed at high altitudes. The aircraft was intended to be supplied in kit form for amateur construction.

The aircraft's designer is Australian Peter Muller, whose design goals were to provide a fast, spacious aircraft with IFR capability. Muller intended that the kit would be sold "at cost".

The prototype made its first substantive flight on 10 October 2020.

During a ferry flight on 6 August 2021 the Raptor prototype crashed in a cornfield, suffering substantial damage. Subsequently, Muller announced that development of the Raptor would end and the company would move onto developing a derivative design, the Raptor Aircraft Raptor NG.

Design and development
The Raptor was a canard design whose main wings have no flaps, a feature which may extend landing and take-off distances, but whose reduced drag may allow higher speeds and reduced fuel consumption. Instead of a fuselage-mounted fin and rudder, each main wing has a winglet and rudder. The tricycle landing gear is fully retractable. The aircraft has been designed (following the area rule) using CAD techniques, and was constructed primarily of carbon fibre, glass fibre and epoxy.

The company made a point of favourably comparing their aircraft against the Cirrus SR22, which has been the world's best-selling general aviation airplane every year since 2002. Raptor Aircraft claim that its plane, compared to the SR22, will be roomier, with a much higher speed, much lower drag, much better economy, and a much lower purchase price. The "finished and flying" price, including engine, is intended to be under US$130,000, with an intention to bring that below $100,000. Prospective buyers made a $2,000 deposit, held in escrow. By December 2018, 1,500 deposits had been received and the company had stopped taking further deposits.  The company does not advertise conventionally; rather it posts regular video bulletins on YouTube to illustrate progress to interested parties.

The company proposed that the Raptor would be suitable as a new air taxi aircraft and for light cargo services and they plan on partnering with a company such as Uber. Also, they proposed that a turboprop version would become available in due course. The company claimed they would "Changing General Aviation in a Big Way", saying:
 "We are offering a completed Raptor 'At Cost' and Open Sourcing the whole program so universities and businesses will be able to have access to the design and make improvements and modifications in the same way that open source works in the software world. We will be opening the parts and airframe construction, support and flight training so companies world-wide can compete for your business thereby keeping availability high and prices low. This will also ensure that there is no single point of failure for parts, airframes or support. This distributed model will eliminate any chance of the Raptor not having support. Much like the internet, the open and distributed nature makes it virtually impossible to destroy. The competition will have a difficult time trying to stop us."

Flight tests
The prototype made a short hop on 21 July 2020, during which it took longer to reach take-off speed than expected and cameras revealed the main landing gear legs exhibited a shimmy on landing. Flight testing took place after those issues were addressed.

The first real flight took place on 10 October 2020 at Valdosta Regional Airport. The aircraft experienced oscillations in yaw and pitch. Also, oil and coolant temperatures were quite high, and climb rate was less than expected, so Muller landed on runway 04 before completing a full circuit. Muller felt that the issues could be caused by not having raised the landing gear, which increased drag and not having the coolant air intake fully open.

On 4 February 2021 during a test flight, the Raptor experienced an oil leak followed by an engine failure caused by an out of position oil seal. The aircraft was glided to an uneventful landing with minor damage from runway contact by one wing tip. During post event testing it was discovered that the #2 cylinder wrist pin had failed as well and an engine swap was required.

On 6 August 2021, the aircraft suffered an engine failure and was substantially damaged in the subsequent crash in a corn field Nebraska. Designer and pilot, Peter Muller was unharmed in the incident.

After the crash of the prototype, Muller announced that he was ending development of the Raptor and moving onto development of the Raptor Aircraft Raptor NG. The NG will use a similar fuselage design, but will be unpressurized and have a shorter box wing design, along with twin electric motors driving ducted fans.

Specifications (projected)

See also
Berkut 360
Cozy III
Glassic SQ2000
Pusher configuration
Rutan Defiant
Rutan Long-EZ
Rutan VariEze
Steve Wright Stagger-Ez
Synergy Aircraft Synergy
Velocity SE
Velocity XL

References

External links

Build and test program video-log on Medium.com

Canard aircraft
Single-engined pusher aircraft
Homebuilt aircraft
Proposed aircraft of the United States